Paul Bocuse (11 February 1926 – 20 January 2018) was a French chef based in Lyon who was known for the high quality of his restaurants and his innovative approaches to cuisine.

A student of Eugénie Brazier, he was one of the most prominent chefs associated with the nouvelle cuisine, which is less opulent and calorific than the traditional cuisine classique, and stresses the importance of fresh ingredients of the highest quality. Paul Bocuse claimed that Henri Gault first used the term, nouvelle cuisine, to describe food prepared by Bocuse and other top chefs for the maiden flight of the Concorde airliner in 1969.

Contributions to French gastronomy

Bocuse made many contributions to French gastronomy both directly and indirectly, because he had numerous students, many of whom have become notable chefs themselves. One of his students was Austrian Eckart Witzigmann, one of four Chefs of the Century and chef at the first German restaurant to receive three Michelin stars. Since 1987, the Bocuse d'Or has been regarded as the most prestigious award for chefs in the world (at least when French food is considered), and is sometimes seen as the unofficial world championship for chefs. Bocuse received numerous awards throughout his career, including the medal of Commandeur de la Légion d'honneur.

The Culinary Institute of America honoured Bocuse in their Leadership Awards Gala on 30 March 2011. He received the  "Chef of the Century" award. In July 2012 the Culinary Institute of America announced in The New York Times that they would change the name of their Escoffier Restaurant to the Bocuse Restaurant, after a year-long renovation.

In 1975, he created soupe aux truffes (truffle soup) for a presidential dinner at the Élysée Palace. Since then, the soup has been served in Bocuse's restaurant near Lyon as Soupe V.G.E., VGE being the initials of former president of France Valéry Giscard d'Estaing.

Restaurants

Bocuse's main restaurant, L'Auberge du Pont de Collonges, is a luxury establishment near Lyon, which has been serving a traditional menu for decades.  It was one of only 27 restaurants in France to receive a three-star rating in 2017 by the Michelin Guide. However, it lost its record-breaking 55-year long 3-star rating in the 2020 Michelin Guide, sparking controversy in the French culinary world. He also operated a chain of brasseries in Lyon, named Le Nord, L'Est, Le Sud and L'Ouest, each of which specialize in a different aspect of French cuisine.

Paul Bocuse's son, Jérôme, manages the "Les Chefs de France" restaurant which the elder Bocuse co-founded with Roger Vergé and Gaston Lenôtre and is located inside the French pavilion at Walt Disney World's EPCOT.

Bocuse was considered an ambassador of modern French cuisine. He was honoured in 1961 with the title Meilleur Ouvrier de France. He had been apprenticed to Fernand Point, a master of classic French cuisine. Bocuse dedicated his first book to him.

Institute Paul Bocuse Worldwide Alliance
In 2004, the Institut Paul Bocuse Worldwide Alliance was created. In 2014, the Alliance brought together students of 14 nationalities for a course in Lyon.

Notable alumni of the programme include Lebanese chef Tara Khattar.

Death
Bocuse died of Parkinson's disease on 20 January 2018 in Collonges-au-Mont-d'Or, in the same room above his restaurant, L'Auberge du Pont de Collonges, in which he was born in 1926. He was 91.

Works
 Paul Bocuse's French Cooking, translated by Colette Rossant (Pantheon Books 1977)
 Bocuse a la Carte, translated by Colette Rossant (Pantheon Books 1987)

See also
 Fernand Point

References

External links

 Official website

1926 births
2018 deaths
Chefs from Lyon
Deaths from Parkinson's disease
People from Lyon Metropolis
French restaurateurs
Head chefs of Michelin starred restaurants
Officers Crosses of the Order of Merit of the Federal Republic of Germany
Commandeurs of the Légion d'honneur
Neurological disease deaths in France